Coleman Rice Shelton (born July 28, 1995) is an American football center for the Los Angeles Rams of the National Football League (NFL). He played college football at Washington.

Early life and high school
Shelton grew up in Pasadena, California and attended Loyola High School. Shelton was rated a three-star recruit and committed to play college football at Washington over offers from Colorado and Nevada.

College career
Shelton was a member of the Washington Huskies for five seasons, redshirting his true freshman season. He played in all 13 of Washington's games as a redshirt freshman, starting seven. Coleman started every game the following season, playing three different positions (left tackle, left guard and right guard). He became the Huskies starting center going into his redshirt junior season and was named second-team All-Pac-12 Conference. Shelton again started all 13 of Washington's games as a redshirt senior and was named first-team All-Pac-12. He was Captain of the 2017 team and was twice awarded the John P. Angel Lineman of the Year trophy for outstanding play.

Professional career

San Francisco 49ers
Shelton was signed by the San Francisco 49ers as an undrafted free agent on April 30, 2018. He was released at the end of training camp.

Arizona Cardinals
Shelton was signed to the Arizona Cardinals practice squad on October 15, 2018. He spent the rest of the 2018 season on the practice squad and was cut at the end of training camp going into the 2019 season.

Los Angeles Rams
Shelton was signed by the Los Angeles Rams on September 2, 2019. Coleman made his NFL debut on September 22, 2019 against the Cleveland Browns. Shelton played in 11 games during the 2019 season. After the season the Rams tendered Shelton to a one-year contract as an exclusive-rights free agent. He signed the tender on April 27, 2020. Shelton played in 15 regular season games and both of the Rams' postseason games during the 2020 season, appearing exclusively on special teams. He was given another exclusive-rights tender by the Rams on March 4, 2021. He signed the tender on April 7.

Shelton saw his first extended playing time in Week 12 of the 2021 season, playing 67 snaps at center after starter Brian Allen suffered a knee injury during the Rams' first offensive snap in a 37-7 win over the Jacksonville Jaguars. He made his first career start the following game against the Arizona Cardinals. Shelton played in all 17 regular season with two starts during the 2021 season and also played in all four of the Rams' postseason games, including the team's 23-20 win over the Cincinnati Bengals in Super Bowl LVI.

On March 14, 2022, Shelton signed a two-year contract extension with the Rams. He was placed on injured reserve on October 8, 2022. He was designated to return from injured reserve on November 9, 2022. He was activated from injured reserve three days later.

On March 15, 2023, Shelton re-signed with the Los Angeles Rams.

References

External links
Washington Huskies bio
Los Angeles Rams bio

1995 births
Living people
American football centers
Los Angeles Rams players
Washington Huskies football players
Players of American football from Pasadena, California
Arizona Cardinals players
San Francisco 49ers players